Year Walk is an adventure game developed and published by Swedish mobile game developer Simogo for iOS devices in 2013. The game is loosely based on an ancient Swedish tradition called "Årsgång" (pronounced [oːʂgɔŋ]; "Year Walk"). The game was ported to Windows and OS X PC platforms via Steam in 2014, and on the Wii U via eShop on September 17, 2015. It was succeeded by the free, e-picturebook Year Walk: Bedtime Stories for Awful Children.

Plot 
Year Walk begins with the protagonist Daniel Svensson visiting his lover, Stina, who hints that she has been proposed to, and warns the player about the dangers of year walking, implying that her cousin had died while engaging in the activity. Daniel returns home, and prepares to engage in the Year Walk anyway.

As he proceeds toward the church (the object of year walking is to get to a church and see the future), the protagonist encounters a series of fairies and mythical creatures from Swedish folklore: the Huldra, the Brook Horse, Mylings, the Night Raven, and finally the Church Grim.

In the end, the player succeeds in receiving glimpses of the future, in the form of ominous bits of conversation that are presumably from Stina. They then see a beautiful grassy meadow. When they venture right, they see Stina on the ground, her eyes closed. At first, she appears unharmed, but then blood seeps from her chest onto her clothes and the grass.

If the player uses the hints given after the credits to access the Journal component of the PC Game/iOS companion app, they can discover the journal of Theodor Almsten, a modern-day man obsessed with Swedish folklore, as he investigates the meaning behind the year walk. Through his research, the full story is revealed. The fate of Almsten himself is also uncertain; his research seems to have taken a toll on his mental state, and his final entry takes place immediately before he goes on a Year Walk of his own. However, Almsten believes that the desire to Year Walk alone is enough to be punished for the Watchers, so it’s implied he met the same fate as Daniel Svennson.

Ultimately clues from the Journal can be used in the game itself to reach an alternate ending, considered the ultimate ending (as it says "the end"). Daniel receives a knife along with a newspaper article from the future describing his execution for the murder of Stina, and a letter from Almsten telling him to do what must be done to save Stina. It is left ambiguous whether Daniel kills himself or uses the knife to facilitate the murder.

Development 
Year Walk started out as a film script that writer Jonas Tarestad shared with developer Simon Flesser. The two considered turning the script into a game, according to Flesser, "almost jokingly to start with". However the two eventually grew serious about the prospect and changed the script so that it would better suit the medium. In the transition from movie script to game script, according to Flesser, they "basically rewrote everything about it" keeping only the beginning and ending the same. In designing the game Flesser studied horror movies, specifically the timing "to get the scary bits right". He has additionally cited the games Killer7, Fez and The Legend of Zelda series as well as the film Hedgehog in the Fog as inspiration.

In collaboration with Dakko Dakko, the developers behind Scram Kitty and his Buddy on Rails, Simogo rebuilt the game from the ground up for release on Nintendo's Wii U console in 2015, taking advantage of the Wii U GamePad for various mechanics.

Reception 

Year Walk received highly positive reviews from critics. Review aggregation website Metacritic provides an average rating of 87 out of 100 based on 32 reviews on iOS, 87 out of 100 based on 8 reviews on PC, and 82 out of 100 based on 12 reviews on Wii U, indicating "generally favorable reviews".

148 Apps gave it a highly positive review, praising nearly every aspect of the game. They gave it a score of 5 out of 5, and said that "Year Walk is a haunting adventure game from Simogo that blends a dark world and involved mythology together to create an absolutely amazing experience."

At the 2013 Unity Awards, Year Walk won the award for Best 2D Artistic Experience. Year Walk was included in Pocket Gamer's "top 10 best iPhone and iPad games of the year - 2013 edition" list.

The game sold 200,000 copies in 2013.

References

External links 
 

2013 video games
Adventure games
2010s horror video games
IOS games
MacOS games
Simogo games
Video games developed in Sweden
Video games set in Sweden
Video games set in the 19th century
Wii U eShop games
Windows games
Works based on folklore
Single-player video games
Video games based on Norse mythology